Ihlegramma is a genus of moths in the family Sphingidae containing only one known species, Ihlegramma ihlei, which is known from Laos. Both the genus and species were first described by Ulf Eitschberger in 2003.

The wingspan is about 87 mm.

References

Sphingini
Moth genera